Tang Erho (Wade-Giles: T'ang Er-ho, 1878 – November 8, 1940) was a medical doctor and politician in the Chinese Beiyang government, later noted for his role as in the collaborationist Provisional Government of the Republic of China.

Biography 
Tang was a native of Hangzhou in Zhejiang Province.  In 1902, he was dispatched by the government of Qing dynasty China to Japan, where he studied at the Seijo School in Tokyo. After his return to China in 1904, he worked initially as a music teacher. He returned to Japan in 1907, studying at the Kanazawa Medical University in Yokohama, and from there went to Germany, where he obtained his medical degree from the Humboldt University of Berlin. After his return to China in 1910, he was appointed to a post at the College of Physicians and has also served as deputy director of Zhejiang Hospital.

In 1911, Tang became active in politics under the Zhejiang military clique. After the formation of the Republic of China in 1912, he organized that National Medical School, and became its first principal. In 1915, he became the president of the Pharmaceutical Society of China. In 1920, he made an extended visit to Europe.

In July 1921, Tang was Deputy Director-General of the Ministry of Education. Following the 1923 Great Kantō earthquake, Tang led a delegation of the Red Cross Society of China to Japan for relief efforts, coordinating with overseas Chinese residents in Japan. In 1926, he rose to the position of Inspector-General of the Ministry of Finance, ultimately succeeding his boss, Pan Fu, in the job, for about six months.
 
However, after the collapse of the Beiyang government in 1929, Tang returned to Japan, where he obtained his doctorate in medicine at the Tokyo Imperial University. Returning to China in 1930, he served as a councilor to the Northeastern Army command. In 1933, he returned to Beijing, where he helped organize a committee for political affairs. He helped negotiate the Tanggu Truce with the Imperial Japanese Army in 1936 and helped organize the Hebei–Chahar Political Council.

In 1937, Tang joined the Provisional Government of the Republic of China under Wang Kemin, serving as chairman of the legislative assembly and chairman of the educational committee. In 1939, he was appointed president of Beijing University and concurrently Chairman of the Council of East Asian Culture. That same year, he gave the eulogy at the state funeral of Wu Peifu.

In 1940, with the formation of the Reorganized National Government of China under Wang Jingwei, Tang served on the North China Political Affairs Commission. It was largely assumed that Tang was Wang Kemin's successor, but Tang died of lung cancer in Beijing in November 1940.

References
 David P. Barrett and Larry N. Shyu, eds.; Chinese Collaboration with Japan, 1932-1945: The Limits of Accommodation Stanford University Press 2001
 John H. Boyle, China and Japan at War, 1937–1945: The Politics of Collaboration (Harvard University Press, 1972).  
 Frederick W. Mote, Japanese-Sponsored Governments in China, 1937–1945 (Stanford University Press, 1954).

1878 births
1940 deaths
Chinese expatriates in Japan
Politicians from Hangzhou
Republic of China politicians from Zhejiang
Chinese collaborators with Imperial Japan
World War II political leaders
Deaths from lung cancer
Deaths from cancer in China
Finance Ministers of the Republic of China